Sukhvor-e Shahbaz-e Shiri (also Romanized as Sūkhvor -e Shahbāz-e Shīrī and Sūkhvor Shahbāz Shīrī; also known as Sūkhūr-e Shahbāz-e Shīrī-ye Soflá) is a village in Heydariyeh Rural District, Govar District, Gilan-e Gharb County, Kermanshah Province, Iran. At the 2006 census, its population was 400, in 81 families.

References 

Populated places in Gilan-e Gharb County